, stylized as KuKeiHa CLUB, is a band that was formed by Motoaki Furukawa, a composer, arranger, and producer working for the game firm Konami, after his work on Gradius III back in 1990. It is often confused with コナミ矩形波倶楽部 (Konami Kukeiha Club), Konami's team of composers (music in Konami games are credited to Konami Kukeiha Club, not Kukeiha Club). It consists of members from Konami's music production department, mirroring similar bands at the time from other game companies such as Capcom's Alph Lyla and Sega's S.S.T. Band. The band has two "original" albums: A self-titled back in 1990 featuring five original songs and five cover tracks and a second album entitled Hope featuring 10 original tracks. In a few rare cases, other members of Kukeiha Club are known to perform live (such as in the 1991 Konami All Stars: The Sentryp-Bako Heisei 4 Nen Ban album). However, they are credited as "Konami Kukeiha Club".

Initial members
Jun Funahashi: keyboards
Motoaki Furukawa: guitar, arrangement
Yukie Morimoto

Primary members
Mami Asano : Keyboards
Motoaki Furukawa: All Guitars & Programming
Tappy (Tappi Iwase): Drums & Percussion

Guest musicians
Akira Jimbo: drums (Kukeiha Club)
Kenichi Mitsuda: keyboards
Kenichiro Fukui: synthesizer (Hope / Kukeiha Club)
Koichi Namiki: guitar (Kukeiha Club pro-fusion: Tokimeki Memorial)
Toyoyuki Tanaka: bass (Kukeiha Club pro-fusion: Salamander)
Masato Honda: saxophone

Discography

External links
 古川もとあきStation: Motoaki Furukawa Official Web Site
 Tappy Iwase Official Site

Japanese house music groups
Japanese instrumental musical groups
Video game composers
Video game musicians